Vortec is a trademarked name for a line of gasoline engines for General Motors trucks. The name first appeared in an advertisement for the 1985 model year 4.3 L V6 that used "vortex technology" to create a vortex inside the combustion chamber, creating a better air/fuel atomization. It has since been used on a wide range of engines. Modern Vortec engines are named for their approximate displacement in cubic centimeters.

I4
 For the Vortec 2200, see General Motors 122 engine.
 For the Vortec 2800, see General Motors Atlas engine.
 For the Vortec 2900, see General Motors Atlas engine.
I5
 For the Vortec 3500, see General Motors Atlas engine.
 For the Vortec 3700, see General Motors Atlas engine.
I6
 For the Vortec 4200, see General Motors Atlas engine.
V6
 For the Vortec 4300, see Chevrolet 90° V6 engine.
V8
 For the Vortec 4800, see General Motors small-block engine.
 For the Vortec 5000, see Chevrolet small-block engine (first- and second-generation).
 For the Vortec 5300, see General Motors small-block engine.
 For the Vortec 5700, see Chevrolet small-block engine (first- and second-generation).
 For the Vortec 6000, see General Motors small-block engine.
 For the Vortec 6200, see General Motors small-block engine.
 For the Vortec 6600, see General Motors small-block engine.
 For the Vortec 7400, see Chevrolet big-block engine.
 For the Vortec 8100, see Chevrolet big-block engine.

References

 https://jl-discourse-uploads.s3.amazonaws.com/original/2X/4/450304d1f4f1bdce16fd8490bfa40a315db0df19.jpg

General Motors engines